The origin of the Huns and their relationship to other peoples identified in ancient sources as Iranian Huns such as the Xionites, the Alchon Huns, the Kidarites, the Hephthalites, the Nezaks, and the Huna, has been the subject of long-term scholarly controversy. In 1757, Joseph de Guignes first proposed that the Huns were identical to the Xiongnu. The thesis was then popularized by Edward Gibbon. Since that time scholars have debated the proposal on its linguistic, historical, and archaeological merits. In the mid-twentieth century, the connection was attacked by the Sinologist Otto J. Maenchen-Helfen and largely fell out of favor. Some recent scholarship has argued in favor of some form of link, and the theory returned to the mainstream, but remains disputed.

The chief piece of evidence linking the Xiongnu to the European and Iranian Huns is the similarity of their names. Supporting evidence is provided by historical records indicating that the term Xiongnu was used for the people referred to in Sogdian and Sanskrit texts as the Xwn and Huṇa respectively, terms used for peoples called Huns in the West. Another important connection is the use of similar metallic cauldrons by the European Huns and the Xiongnu. There remain a number of outstanding differences, however, including generally different archaeological profiles and a wide variety of customs attested among the various Hunnic groups. Additionally, there is a two hundred-year gap between the last recorded activities of the Xiongnu and the first appearance of the Huns in Europe and Central Asia. These issues have caused many scholars to reject the identification.

History of the idea of Xiongnu origins

Joseph de Guignes (1757) first proposed a connection between the European Huns and the Xiongnu on basis of the similarity between the nomadic lifestyles of both peoples and the similarity of their names. In making this equation, de Guignes was not interested in establishing any sort of cultural, linguistic, or ethnic connection between the Xiongnu and the Huns: instead, it was the manner of political organisation that made both "Huns". The equation was then popularized by its acceptance by Edward Gibbon in his The History of the Decline and Fall of the Roman Empire (1776–1789). David Curtis Wright derives the commonly repeated myth that the Great Wall of China was built to repel the Xiongnu from a passage in Gibbon. Gibbon argued, from his reading of de Guignes, that the Iranian ("White") and European Huns derived from two distinct divisions of the Xiongnu that survived the destruction of their regime near China proper. After Gibbon, this thesis quickly became widely accepted among various historians of the Huns.

In the nineteenth century, the question was mostly debated by linguists who sought to relate the name and language of the Xiongnu or Huns to one another. Because language was closely associated with ethnicity to nineteenth-century scholars, it became necessary to prove both the physical descent of the Huns from the Xiongnu and that they had shared the same language. While the theory of Xiongnu origins remained popular, a number of scholars raised objections because they believed that the Huns spoke a Finno-Ugric language, whereas the Xiongnu spoke a Turkic or Mongolic language. Similarly, some nineteenth-century Russian scholars argued that the Huns spoke a Slavic language and thus could not be descended from the non-Slavic-speaking Xiongnu. In the late nineteenth century, the classical historian J. B. Bury questioned de Guignes and Gibbon's identification of the Huns with the Xiongnu, arguing that they merely had similar names. He later revised this position, however, and came to accept the link.

At the beginning of the twentiethcentury, German Sinologist Friedrich Hirth discovered passages in the Chinese annals, principally the Wei shu, which he believed proved the connection between the Huns and the Xiongnu. Hirth's work convinced many, and by the 1940s there was a general consensus among historians and archaeologists that the Xiongnu and the Huns were related. However, in 1945 Otto J. Maenchen-Helfen argued that Hirth had misinterpreted the Chinese annals. Through Maenchen-Helfen's work, "[t]he Hirth thesis was dealt a considerable blow". Maenchen-Helfen also argued against the identification based on then-current archaeology and on ethnographic grounds. Maenchen-Helfen would go on to cast doubt on new theories that equated the Huns and the Xiongnu on the basis of their names in several articles and his most import work The World of the Huns (173). Maenchen-Helfen's skepticism was also taken up by prominent Eurasianist Denis Sinor.

Writing in 2009, Christopher Beckwith refers to there being a "general consensus among Eurasianists" that the Xiongnu and Huns are not related. This consensus has been challenged by historian Étienne de la Vaissière (2005 and 2015), historian and linguist Christopher Atwood (2012), archaeologist Toshio Hayashi (2014), and historian Hyun Jin Kim (2013 and 2015). Nevertheless, writing in 2020, Alexander Savelyev and Choongwon Jeong refer to the proposed connection as having "only limited support in modern scholarship".

Etymological evidence

The chief piece of evidence connecting the Xiongnu to the other Hunnic groups is the apparent similarity of their names. These are recorded in Chinese as Xiōngnú, Greek Οὖννοι (Ounnoi), Latin Hunni, Sogdian Xwn, Sanskrit Hūṇa, Middle Persian Ẋyon and Armenian Hon-k’. The equivalence of the meaning of Ẋyon to Hun is shown by Syriac use of Hūn to refer to the people called Ẋyon in Persian sources, while Zoroastrian texts in Persian use Ẋyon for the people called Hūṇa in Sanskrit. Étienne de la Vaissière has shown that Xiōngnú and the Sogdian and Sanskrit terms Xwm and Hūṇa were used to refer to the same people. The Alchon Huns, meanwhile, identify themselves as ALXONO on their coinage, with xono representing Hun: they were identified as Hūṇa in Indian sources. The Hephthalites identify themselves as OIONO, likely a version of Hun, on their coinage, and are called "White Huns" by the Greek historian Procopius and "White Hūṇa" (Śvēta Hūṇa) by Sanskrit authors. The Chinese Wei shu attested a title Wēnnàshā for the Kidarite rulers from Bactria who conquered Sogdia, which Christopher Atwood and Kazuo Ennoki interpret as a Chinese transcription of Onnashāh, meaning king of the Huns; the Byzantines also called these people Huns.

Referring to the Huns and the Xiongnu, Denis Sinor argued that it was merely "a fortuitous consonance of the two names" that had led to the identification. Maenchen-Helfen regarded the Iranian Huns (the Chionites, Hephthalites, and Huna) as having had the same name, though he questioned the significance of this fact. He argues that "Huns and Hsiung-Nu may have borne the same name, and still may have been as different as the Walloons from the Welsh or the Venetians from the Wends." Richard Frye argued that the various Iranian Huns deliberately used the name Hun in order to frighten their enemies. Scholars such as H.W. Bailey and Denis Sinor have argued that the name Hun may have been a generic name for steppe nomads, deriving from the Iranian word Ẋyon, meaning enemies. De la Vaissière, Christopher Atwood, and Kim all reject this etymology, however. Both de la Vaissière and Kim regard the apparent use of the same name by the European and Iranian Huns as "a clear indication that they regarded this link with the old steppe tradition of imperial grandeur as valuable and significant, a sign of their original identity and future ambitions no doubt".

There are, however, potential problems with equating the names Xiōngnú and Hun. Maenchen-Helfen notes that the Chinese transcription is only an approximation of their actual name. As proof of its imprecision, he notes that Emperor Wang Mang actually renamed the Xiongnu as the Hsiang-nu, with the first element meaning "to submit", while on bad terms with the group. Later, when on good terms, he renamed them Kung-nu, with the first element meaning "respectful". Christopher Beckwith, moreover, notes that the pronunciation of Xiongnu in Old Chinese is uncertain. While it was likely pronounced *χoŋnʊ or *χʲoŋnʊ in Middle Chinese, it is possible it was taken into Old Chinese before the change of initial s to χ, meaning it could correspond to an Iranian name like Saka or skuδa (Scythian). E.G. Pulleyblank suggested an Old Chinese pronunciation similar to *flông-nah and connected this name to a nomadic people attested in Greek as the Phrounoi (Φροῦνοι).

Although he reconstructs the Old Chinese form of Xiōngnú as either *x(r)joŋ-na, *hɨoŋ-na, *hoŋ-nâ or *xoŋ-NA, thus dismissing Beckwith's or Pulleyblank's suggestion, Atwood notes a number of additional problems with equating the Western forms of the name Hun with the name Xiōngnú: 1) Xiōngnú has twosyllables, while Sogdian, Armenian, Syriac, and Persian have one, and in Greek and Latin the secondsyllable seems to be a case ending; 2) Xiōngnú begins with the velar spirant x, whereas Sanskrit and Armenian have the glottal spirant h, and Greek lacks a spirant; 3) Xiōngnú has a velar nasal ŋ, whereas Sanskrit has a retroflex nasal ṇ and the other forms have the dental nasal n; 4) Xiōngnú has a semi-vowel ʲ or ɨ before the main vowel, whereas only Persian has a semi-vowel before its main vowel. Atwood's solution to this difficulty is to posit that the Western versions all derive, directly or indirectly, from Sanskrit Hūṇa, which is an independent transcription of the same name rendered by the Chinese as Xiōngnú, and which also appears in Greek as Χωναι (Khōnai). He further argues that the Persian form Ẋyon is not etymologically related to the other names, but rather an "archaicizing" name that simply sounded similar to the name Hun.

Whereas in de la Vaissière's reading the name Hun was the endonym of the Hunnic tribes, Atwood suggests it may have been an exonym used by Iranian-speaking merchants and interpreters.

Historical and textual evidence
There is a gap of about two hundred years between the conquest of the Xiongnu by the Xianbei and their disappearance from Chinese historical records and the appearance of the Huns in Greco-Roman sources. According to the Book of the Later Han, the final known Xiongnu emperor either disappeared to the west or moved to the territory of the Wusun in modern Kazakhstan in 91. According to the Wei shu, they then moved farther west to around modern Tashkent, where they were defeated by the Xianbei in 153after this, nothing further is recorded about them for twocenturies.

Denis Sinor argued that the origins of the Huns cannot be established beyond what it is said in the work of Roman historian Ammianus Marcellinus: Ammianus said that the Huns dwelled beyond the Sea of Azov next to "the frozen ocean" before they entered Europe, though Sinor does not take "frozen ocean" literally. Both he and Maenchen-Helfen, meanwhile, note that Ammianus refers to the Huns having been "little known", not unknown, before they appeared in 370: they connect this with a mention of a people called the Khounoi by the geographer Ptolemy in the mid-second century. Maenchen-Helfen notes, moreover, that the fact that the Huns were not noticed before 370 is not proof that they came from far away, comparing them to the ancient Hungarians: "We know by now that the Magyars (Hungarians) lived for three hundred years practically unnoticed by the Byzantines in the region of the Dnieper, Bug, Dniester, Pruth, and Sereth before they swept over Central Europe very much like the Huns".

Other scholars have put forth evidence from non-European sources to support a link. Writing in third-century China, a Buddhist monk from northern Bactria (modern Afghanistan), named Zhu Fahu (in Chinese) or Dharmarakṣa (in Sanskrit), translated the ethnonym "Huṇa" from Sanskrit into Chinese as "Xiongnu". This is the earliest attested usage of the name Huṇa, and Étienne de la Vaissière argues that "the use of the name Huṇa in these texts has a precise political reference to the Xiongnu". A second important piece of textual evidence is the letter of a Sogdian merchant named Nanaivande, written in 313: the letter describes raids by the "Xwn" on cities in Northern China. Contemporary Chinese sources identify these same people as the Xiongnu. De la Vaissière, therefore, concludes that "'Hun/Xwm/Huṇa' were the exact transcriptions of the name that the Chinese [...] had rendered as 'Xiongnu'".

Another important historical document supporting the identification is the Wei shu. Scholar Friedrich Hirth (1909) believed that a passage in the Wei Shu identified the Xiongnu as conquering the Alans and the Crimea, the first conquests of the European Huns. Otto Maenchen-Helfen was able to show that Hirth's identification of the people and land conquered as the Alans and the Crimea was untenable, however: the Wei Shu instead referred to a conquest of Sogdia by a group that Maenchen-Helfen identified with the Hephthalites, and much of the text was corrupted by later interpolations from other sources. De la Vaissière, however, notes that a Chinese encyclopedia known as the Tongdian preserves parts of the original Wei Shu, including the passage discussed by Hirth and Maenchen-Helfen: he notes that it describes the conquest of Sogdia by the Xiongnu at around 367, the same time that Persian and Armenian sources describe the Persians fighting the Chionites. Sinor explicitly denied any connection between the Chionites and the Huns, claiming the former to have been Turks, unlike the Huns. However, writing in 2013, Hyun Jin Kim refers to a "general consensus among Historians that the Chionites and the Huns were one and the same". A fifth-century Chinese geographical work, the Shi-san zhou ji by Gan Yi, notes that the Alans and Sogdians were under different rulers (the European Huns and the Chionites respectively), suggesting some believed that they had been conquered by the same people.

Using numismatic evidence, Robert Göbl argued that there were fourdistinct invasions or migrations of Hunnic people into Persia, excluding the Chionites, who did not produce any coinage. While these invasions may have been "causally related" to the European Huns, the people were not, according to Martin Schottky, directly connected to the European Huns. De la Vaissière has challenged this interpretation through his use of Chinese sources. He argues that all of the Hunnic groups migrated West in a single migration in the middle of the fourth-century, rather than in successive waves as other scholars have argued. He further argues that "the different groups of Huns were firmly based in Central Asia at the middle of the fourthcentury. Thus they bring a unity of time and place to the question of the origins of the Huns of Europe".

Archaeological evidence

Archaeology has discovered few links between the material culture of the Huns and Eastern Central Asia. The most significant potential archaeological link between the European Huns and the Xiongnu are the similar bronze cauldrons used by the Huns and the Xiongnu. The cauldrons used by the European Huns appear to be a further development of cauldrons that had been used the Xiongnu. Kim argues that this shows that the European Huns preserved the Xiongnu cultural identity. Toshio Hayashi has argued that one might be able to track the westward migration of the Huns/Xiongnu by following the finds of these cauldrons. Ursula Brosseder, however, argues that there are no intermediate types between the forms of the cauldron known for the Xiongnu and those known for the European Huns. She also notes that the cauldrons, as a single archaeological artifact, cannot prove a Xiongnu-Hun migration. Nor can it be assumed, she argues, that the Huns and Xiongnu used their cauldrons in the same manner, as the Xiongnu cauldrons are usually deposited in graves, whereas the Hun cauldrons are found deposited alone near water.

Heather notes that both groups made use of similar weapons. Maenchen-Helfen, however, argues that the arrowheads used by the various "Hunnic" groups are quite different from one other.

Maenchen-Helfen argued in 1945 that there is no evidence that the Xiongnu ever performed artificial cranial deformation, whereas this is attested for the European Huns. Artificial cranial deformation is attested for the Hephthalites, however, which Kim suggests shows a link. More recent archaeological finds suggest that the first-century so-called "Kenkol group" from around the Syr Darya river performed artificial cranial deformation and might be associated with the Xiongnu. The practice was extremely widespread in Central Eurasia from the firstcentury onwards.

Maenchen-Helfen also argues that the Huns have been identified with finds of gold leaves with scale patterns, whereas nothing comparable has ever been found for the Xiongnu. Objects of the Ordos culture, which Maenchen-Helfen connects to the Xiongnu, are similarly very different from anything found from the Huns, whose art lacks any of the Ordos animal motifs. Writing in 2018, Ursula Brosseder argues that
despite major advances in recent decades in the archaeology of Mongolia, the Altai, Tuva, and southern Siberia, the basic fact has remained unchanged, that the material assemblages from these Inner Asian regions are distinct from those of the European Huns.
Brosseder attributes individual objects of Hunnic of Xiongnu style found in either Inner Asia in the fourthand fifthcenturies or on Ukrainian Steppe of the first and second centuries as signs of regional connectivity rather than as evidence of migration. She nevertheless argues that archaeology is unlikely to prove or disprove any migration, as such movements often leave no trace in the archaeological record.

Ethnographic and linguistic evidence
Ethnographic descriptions have caused scholars such as Peter Heather to doubt a connection between the Huns and Xiongnu. The Xiongnu are described as wearing queues, whereas the Huns are not. Maenchen-Helfen also notes that the Huns are described as beardless, whereas the Xiongnu are described as bearded.

Speaking of the Hephthalites, Maenchen-Helfen argues on the basis of their description in Procopius that the Hephthalites were "totally different from the Huns". He notes while the Huns practised polygamy, the Hephthalites seem to have practised polyandry. Procopius also claims that the Hephthalites had "white bodies", whereas the other Huns were darker skinned. Hyun Jin Kim argues that Procopius was simply misled by the use of "white" in the name "White Huns", which actually refers to geography, not skin tone.

Heather further notes that while the Xiongnu had a unified state and a ruler named the chanyu, the European Huns seem to have arrived without any single leader. Kim argues that the Huns actually did arrive in Europe under unified rule, but that this is not directly reflected in surviving sources.

As a cultural similarity between the Huns and Xiongnu, Kim notes that both appear to have practised a sword cult (for the Xiongnu known as the kenglu, known in Western sources as the "Sword of Mars").

Maenchen-Helfen argues that the Xiongnu appear to have spoken a Mongolic language, whereas he believes the Huns spoke a Turkic language and the Hephthalites spoke an Iranian language. Elsewhere, Maenchen-Helfen speaks of the Hephthalites as "the only exception" to the fact that various Hunnic groups (excluding the Xiongnu) seem to have spoken the same language. Peter Golden, however, argues that the Hephthalites may have spoken a form of Proto-Mongolic and later adopted an Iranian language from the sedentary population they ruled, saying "[i]n this, their behavior was typical of nomads". Hyun Jin Kim argues, on the basis of work by E. G. Pulleyblank and A. Vovin, that the Xiongnu likely spoke a Yeniseian language, but switched to being Turkic-speaking during their migrations westward.

Genetic evidence
In a genetic study of individuals from the around the Tian Shan mountains of central Asia dating from the late second century CE,  found that these individuals represented a population of mixed East Asian and West Eurasian origin. They argued that this population descended from Xiongnu who expanded westward and mixed with Iranian Sakas. This population in the Tian Shan mountains may be connected to the European Huns by individual burials that contains objects stylistically related to those used by the European Huns, although this could be a sign of the exchange of goods and the connections between elites rather than a sign of migration.

A genetic study published in Scientific Reports in November 2019 led by Neparáczki Endre had examined the remains of three males from three separate 5th century Hunnic cemeteries in the Pannonian Basin. They were found to be carrying the paternal haplogroups Q1a2, R1b1a1b1a1a1 and R1a1a1b2a2. In modern Europe, Q1a2 is rare and has its highest frequency among the Székelys. All of the Hunnic males studied were determined to have had brown eyes and black or brown hair, and to have been of mixed European and East Asian ancestry. The results were consistent with a Xiongnu origin of the Huns.

However, Savelyev & Jeong et al. 2020 reports while there is East Eurasian genetics detected in the Huns, no ancient genome from the Carpathian basin has been reported to test the Eastern Eurasian genetic connection, but such a conclusion was also based on the lack of Xiongnu archaeogenetics samples. At the same time, the Western Eurasian population connected with various Indo-European languages of Europe (Germanic and Ossetic, in particular) played a crucial role in the formation of Huns. Many of the Huns' names suggest they were European locally and have no connection with Turkic speakers. While the Huns do have some steppe ancestry there isn't even enough evidence to directly link the Huns only with the Xiongnu. In the same year  examined 52 Xiongnu skeletal remains and found that the Xiongnu shared paternal (R1a1a1b2a-Z94, R1a1a1b2a2-Z2124, Q1a and N1a) and maternal haplotypes with the Huns, and suggested on this basis that the Huns were descended from Xiongnu, who they in turn suggested were descended from Scytho-Siberians.

 found that an elite Hun with Y-DNA haplogroup R1a1a1b-Z645 from mid-4th century Hungary closely clustered with a same century Hun from Western Kazakhstan and the Xianbei Hun from Berel with ancient northeast Asian (ANA) groups. The next year,  examined a 5th century male from Hungary, he belonged to paternal R1a1a1b2a2b2-Y57 and maternal haplogroup H5, and mostly had West Eurasian origin.  sequenced 9 skeletal remains from 4-5th century Hungary, two out of seven men carried R1a1a1b2a2a3c-Z94 while others R1a1a1b1a2b3a1-FGC13709 and R1a1a1b2a2b2-Y57 (Eastern Europe), R1b1a1b1a1a1c2b2b1a-S1746 and R1b1a1b1b3a1a1-CTS9219 (North-Western Europe). According to it, the genetic data is in accordance with interdisciplinary sources as confirming theories of Xiongnu/Hunnic origin from modern-day Mongolia and their subsequent mixing with Scythians/Sarmatians and Germanics/Goths after traveling toward Europe.

Notes

References

 

 

 
 
 
 

 
 
 
 
 

 
 
 

Huns
Nomadic groups in Eurasia
Invasions of Europe
History of India
Bactria
Historical Iranian peoples
Huns
Xiongnu
History of Mongolia